Jorge Portelli (born 12 December 1950) is an Argentine judoka. He competed in the men's half-heavyweight event at the 1976 Summer Olympics.

References

1950 births
Living people
Argentine male judoka
Olympic judoka of Argentina
Judoka at the 1976 Summer Olympics
Place of birth missing (living people)